Browns Island (also Gwin Island or Brown Island) is a  regional preserve of the East Bay Regional Park District (EBRPD) in Pittsburg, Contra Costa County, California, United States. It is an island in Suisun Bay, part of the Sacramento-San Joaquin River Delta, separated from the rest of Pittsburg by New York Slough.

The  island is separated from Winter Island to the east by Middle Slough, and bounded by New York Slough on the south and Suisun Bay on the west and northwest. It is shown, labeled "Gwin Island", on an 1850 survey map of the San Francisco Bay area made by Cadwalader Ringgold and an 1854 map of the area by Henry Lange.

The East Bay Regional Park District has published a guide to the wild plants that grow on this island. The island is home to six rare and endangered plant species, and a variety of aquatic birds.

References

See also
List of islands of California

Notes

External links
 Browns Island at the East Bay Regional Park District website
 Guide to Browns Island Wildflowers at the EBRPD website

Islands of the Sacramento–San Joaquin River Delta
Islands of Northern California
Islands of Suisun Bay
Islands of Contra Costa County, California
East Bay Regional Park District
Parks in Contra Costa County, California
Pittsburg, California
Uninhabited islands of California